Voltage-gated potassium channel subunit beta-1 is a protein that in humans is encoded by the KCNAB1 gene.

Potassium channels represent the most complex class of voltage-gated ion channels from both functional and structural standpoints. Their diverse functions include regulating neurotransmitter release, heart rate, insulin secretion, neuronal excitability, epithelial electrolyte transport, smooth muscle contraction, and cell volume. Four sequence-related potassium channel genes - shaker, shaw, shab, and shal - have been identified in Drosophila, and each has been shown to have human homolog(s). This gene encodes a member of the potassium channel, voltage-gated, shaker-related subfamily. This member includes three distinct isoforms that are encoded by three alternatively spliced transcript variants of this gene. These three isoforms are beta subunits, which form heteromultimeric complex with alpha subunits and modulate the activity of the pore-forming alpha subunits.

See also
 Voltage-gated potassium channel

References

Further reading

External links 
 

Ion channels